Calambur Sivaramamurti, (1909–1983) was an Indian museologist, art historian and epigraphist who is primarily known for his work as curator in the Government Museum, Chennai. and Sanskrit scholar. His entire life has been devoted to the study and exposition of various aspects of Indian art. Apart from authoring several monographs, guide books on Indian art, he also wrote a seminal work on South Indian epigraphy.

Career
After a brilliant academic career, C. Sivaramamurti entered the museum profession as curator for Archaeology in the Madras Museum.  He then joined the Archaeological Survey of India as Superintendent, Archaeological Section, Indian Museum, Calcutta, whence he came over to the National Museum as Keeper and rose as Assistant Director and finally became the Director. Closely associated with the International Council of Museums he was on its executive committee and was Chairman of the Indian National Committee of ICOM.  He conducted pioneering research and wrote extensively on various subjects during his tenure at the Indian national Museum.

Eminent archaeologist, zoologist and student of archaeology, Frederic Henry Gravely, along with the Curator Dr. C. Sivaramamurti, ensured in 1938 that the antiquities and industrial art collected by the Museum was organised effectively, into a collection that exists even today. His monumental book L'Art en Inde originally published in French earned the Dadabhai Naoroji Award.  The book is available in German, English, Spanish and Italian.
Dr.C.Sivaramamurti was the first fellow of the Jawaharlal Nehru Memorial Fundwhen it was instituted, as he was specially chosen by the Trustees of this Fund in an endeavour to set a standard to Indian scholarship. He did a special exhaustive study of Nataraja, the dancing form of Siva, in all aspects as represented in Art, thought and literature. The product of two years of efforts was a monumental work,"Nataraja in Art, Thought and Literature", which he dedicated to his parents.
Nataraja in Art, Thought and Literature is acclaimed as his major achievement. First published 1974, it was 412 pages with 22 colour plates and over 250 monochrome illustrations. Nataraja as a theme represents life force itself. The ancients visualised Nataraja as a manifestation of the cosmic energy symbolising the three aspects of creation, preservation and destruction. Chapters include: Natya, The Significance of Siva's Dance, Karanas Presented in Siva's Tandava, Karanas Presented by Vishnu as Krishna, The Vedic Roots of the Concept of The Great Dancer, Nataraja Pictured in literature, Varieties of Nataraja as Described in Silpa Texts, Nataraja Form in Sculpture and Painting, The Nataraja Concept Beyond Indian Frontiers.

The dance of Nataraja has always been synonymously viewed with truth and beauty, force and rhythm, movement and change, realisation and dissolution.  Nataraja has been visualised in variety of forms by seers, poets and artists; it has been chiselled, painted, described and sung about in many parts of India and countries. This itself is a testimony to the twin aspects of time and timelessness of Nataraja, both as a personality and as a theme.  This book highlights Nataraja as the presiding deity of fine arts whether it be music, dance, painting, sculpture or epigraphy.  The Vedic roots of the cosmic dancer and the blend of tradition and modernity is woven as a thread throughout the book describing vividly the exploits of the great dancer on world stage.  It also contains interesting information on famous spots of the Nataraja theme and the concept of Nataraja beyond Indian frontiers. Dr. Sivaramamurti has been one of the most acclaimed art historians of this country.  He had devoted an entire lifetime to iconography, especially to the Nataraja theme.  This book was an outcome of his research as part of the Jawaharlal Nehru Fellowship awarded to him in 1968. In her foreword to this book, Mrs. Indira Gandhi called it' a monument to Indian Scholarship.'

Dr. Sivaramamurti has been responsible for popularising epigraphy and numismatics, sculpture and paintings from an approach through literature giving literary parallels.  His love for Sanskrit and art, his aesthetic taste and capacity to draw, paint and sculpt helped him to achieve his purpose of such a study of art and literature. He was a frail man with conspicuous vibhuti and tilak on his forehead. Dr. Sivaramamurti belonged to the lineage of the great Appayya Dikshita. He was the son of Calambur Sundara Sastri, a civil servant, a great Sanskrit scholar of his times and author of a great kavya in Sanskrit,'Sundara Ramayana'. C.Sundara Sastri was an ardent devotee of Rama and as if by divine will his son, Sivaramamurti was married to Sampurna, the granddaughter of the great Ramayana exponent Paruthiyur Krishna Sastri and daughter of Pattabhi Rama Sastri, then District educational Officer of Tanjore.  They had two sons Sundararamamurti and Krishnamurti

Death
Dr. Sivaramamurti died in 1983 of a heart attack during a lecture on the specific features of a rare Nataraja icon.

Dr. Sivaramamurti is an Honorary Fellow of the Royal Asiatic Society of Great Britain and Ireland.  Sri Sankaracharya the great Chandrasekharendra Saraswati Swamigal of Kanchi Kamakoti Peetha conferred on him the title of Vichitrachitta- meaning 'the curious minded one'. The great Pallava ruler of the 8th century from south India, Mahendravarman, held this epithet 'vichitrachitta', as described by him in his inscription in the rock-cut temple of the Trinity, Brahma, Vishnu and easwara (siva) at Kudumiamalai. He was awarded by the President of India, the Padma Sri in 1968 and the Padma Bhushan in 1975.  He travelled widely, participated in international seminars, delivered important lectures at the invitation of several universities, which have been published as books.  He delivered important endowment lectures at many universities in India.  He has over thirty-four books and innumerable papers on sculpture, painting, architecture, iconography, epigraphy, numismatics and literature to his credit.  He was honoured with a number of awards during his lifetime, and in view of his contribution to Oriental Research, in 1981, the Asiatic Society of Bombay posthumously awarded a special Campbell Memorial Gold Medal.

Works
 Mahabalipuram (1952)
 Early Eastern Chalukya Sculpture (1962)
 Indian Epigraphy and South Indian Scripts (1966)
 Nataraja in Art, Thought, and Literature (1974)
 L'Art en Inde (1974)
 Chitrasutra of the Vishnudharmottara (1978)
 Kalugumalai and Early Pandyan Rock-cut Shrines
 Sanskrit Literature and Art: Mirrors of Indian Culture
 La stupa du Barabudur (in French)
 An Album of Indian Sculpture
 Rishis in Indian art and literature
 Royal conquests and cultural migrations in South India and the Deccan
 Vijayanagara paintings
 Numismatic parallels of Kalidasa
 Sculpture inspired by Kalidasa
 Sri Lakshmi in Indian art and thought
 Ramo Vigrahavan dharmah-Rama embodiment of righteousness
 Birds and animals in Indian sculpture
 Sanskrit literature and art
 Mirrors of Indian culture
 Satarudriya – Vibhuti of Siva's Iconography
 Panorama of Jain art
 Shiva
 Ethical fragrance in Indian art and literature
 Indian Painting
 Approach to nature in Indian art and thought
 The art of India
 Expressive Quality of Literary flavour in Art
 Early Andhra Arts and Iconography
 Indian Bronze
 The Chola temples: Thanjavur, Gangaikondacholapuram & Darasuram
 Early eastern Chalukya sculpture
 Harappan Art
 Indian epigraphy and South Indian scripts
 Bhagavatpada-Sri Sankaracharya
 Epigraphical echoes of Kalidasa
 5000 years of the art of India: with Mario Bussagli
 An Introduction to South Indian Temple Architecture and Sculptures, co-authored with F. H. Gravely
 Illustrations of Indian Sculptures, co-authored with F. H. Gravely
 Guide to the Archaeological Galleries, co-authored with  F.H.Gravely
 Notes on Hindu Images, co-authored with F. H. Gravely

References

Recipients of the Padma Shri in literature & education
Recipients of the Padma Bhushan in civil service
Indian male sculptors
Sivaramamurti, C.
1909 births
1983 deaths
Indian art historians
Indian numismatists
Sanskrit grammarians
Indian Sanskrit scholars
20th-century Indian sculptors
20th-century Indian historians
Jawaharlal Nehru Fellows
Indian museologists
Historians of Indian art